Druid's Glen is a hotel and golf resort in Newtownmountkennedy, Republic of Ireland, situated about  south of Dublin in County Wicklow.  The resort consists of the 5-star  Druid's Glen Hotel & Country Club, two championship golf courses, and Woodstock House, the clubhouse at Druid's Glen.

The "Druids Glen Golf Course", opened in 1995, and was the venue for the Irish Open between 1996 and 1999, and the 2002 Seve Trophy.  The second course on the site is the "Druids Heath Golf Course", which opened in 2003 and has hosted 'the Irish PGA'.

Druids Glen has now been reconstructed on HB studios The Golf Club Game on PS4, Xbox1 and PC via Steam in 2015.

References

Golf clubs and courses in the Republic of Ireland
Golf in Leinster
Sports venues in County Wicklow
Irish Open (golf) venues